Kaymashbash (Qaymaşabaş) is a rural locality (a selo) in Itkineyevsky Selsoviet, Yanaulsky District, Bashkortostan, Russia. The population was 323 as of 2010. There are 2 streets.

Geography 
Kaymashbash is located 14 km southeast of Yanaul (the district's administrative centre) by road. Kaymasha is the nearest rural locality.

References 

Rural localities in Yanaulsky District